TCI may refer to:

Locations
Tenerife Airport (disambiguation), airport code of Tenerife International Airport (1964–1978), still used as a code for the island of Tenerife in general
Turks and Caicos Islands

Medicine
Target controlled infusion, a method of administering general anaesthesia

Psychology
Temperament and Character Inventory (TCI) of personality traits
Theme centered interaction, a method for social learning in groups
Therapeutic Crisis Intervention, protocol used in residential childcare facilities

Religion
 Taoist Church of Italy, a confessional religious body of Taoism in Italy

Technology
Tag Control Information, a data field in IEEE 802.1Q VLAN tagging

Organizations and companies
Tall Clubs International, organization of clubs of tall people in North America
Tele-Communications Inc., former US cable television company
Telecommunication Company of Iran
Televisione Cristiana in Italia, an Italian religious television channel
Telus Communications Inc., a Canadian telecommunications subsidiary of Telus Corporation
Tennessee Coal, Iron and Railroad Company, former steel manufacturer, Alabama, USA
Texas Correctional Industries, division of Texas Department of Criminal Justice, USA
The Children's Investment Fund Management, UK hedge fund management
Thistletown Collegiate Institute, a school in Toronto, Canada
Touring Club Italiano
Toyota Canada Inc.
Transport Corporation of India Ltd
Transportation and Climate Initiative, a proposed interstate compact